Cincinnati Christian Schools is a private Christian school near Fairfield, Ohio.

Cincinnati Christian Schools is a private, PK-Grade 12, non-denominational Christian school located in Fairfield, Ohio. The Elementary Campus is on State Route 4 just north of I-275 and serves PK-Grade 6. The JH/SH Campus is on Morris Road near the intersection of State Route 4 Bypass and State Route 129 and serves Grades 7-12.

Background
Greater Cincinnati Christian High School was established in 1971 at the Springdale Baptist Church.  The same year, Tri-County Christian Elementary School opened for grades kindergarten through third, operated by Tri-County Assembly Church of God.  In 1973, Tri-County added fourth through sixth grades.  In 1975 Tri-County assumed control of Greater Cincinnati Christian, forming a kindergarten through twelfth grade educational system.

In 1993, the schools separated financially and operationally from the Tri-County Assembly Church of God and became Cincinnati Christian Schools.  The schools are now operated by a non-denominational board of directors.

Years of planning and preparation culminated in the summer of 2002, when CCS acquired the facilities of the Courts of Praise Christian Center. That facility on Morris Road became the Junior/Senior High Campus and now serves Grades 7-12. The Elementary Campus, at the facilities of TCA on Dixie Highway, serves Grades PK-6. Today the two campuses of CCS have a combined enrollment of more than 580 students.

Brief Historical Timeline

1971—Greater Cincinnati Christian High School began (Grades 7—11; added Grade 12 in 1972; utilized the facilities of Springdale Baptist Church)

1971—Tri-County Christian Elementary School began (Grades K—3; added Grades 4—6 in 1973; utilized the facilities of TCA)

1975—Greater Cincinnati Christian High School and Tri-County Christian Elementary School merged; operated by TCA under the name Tri-County Christian Schools

1993—Tri-County Christian Schools became independent from TCA and was incorporated as Cincinnati Christian Schools, Inc.

2002—Grades K—5 remained at the facilities of TCA; Grades 6—12 moved to the newly acquired campus of the Courts of Praise Christian Center

2007—An early education (preschool) program was added at the Elementary Campus

References

External links
 School Website

Christian schools in Ohio
High schools in Butler County, Ohio
Educational institutions established in 1971
Private high schools in Ohio
Private middle schools in Ohio
Private elementary schools in Ohio
Fairfield, Ohio
1971 establishments in Ohio